Landmark Group is an UAE multinational conglomerate based in Dubai, UAE headed by Micky Jagtiani, who is the founder and chairman of the company. The group is involved in retailing of apparel, footwear, consumer electronics, cosmetics & beauty products, home improvement and baby products. The group also has interests in hospitality & leisure, healthcare and mall management.

Global presence 
Landmark Group has its presence worldwide. It can be broadly classified into retail, hospitality and healthcare.

Corporate social responsibility 
The Group focuses on 3 initiatives: health, environment & community.

The Beat Diabetes Initiative is an awareness campaign that had over 60,000 participants across 7 countries including United Arab Emirates, Kuwait, Bahrain, Qatar, Saudi Arabia, Oman, and India. in its 7th Beat Diabetes Walk

See also 
 List of department stores by country
 Department store
 Micky Jagtiani
 Babyshop Stores

References

External links 
 http://www.landmarkshops.com/

Companies based in Mumbai
India
1973 establishments in the United Arab Emirates
Department stores of the United Arab Emirates
Clothing retailers of India
Department stores of India
Emirati companies established in 1973
Retail companies established in 1973